Arvid Folke Alnevik (31 December 1919 – 17 August 2020) was a Swedish sprinter who specialized in the 400 metres. His best results were in the 4×400 metre relay, winning bronze medals at the 1946 European Championships and the 1948 Summer Olympics. Alnevik was a career military officer and retired with the rank of Major. After that he worked as a sports official and was a driving force behind promotion of golf in the Gävle area. As of the 2018 Winter Olympics, he held the status as the oldest living Olympic medalist.

Alnevik contracted COVID-19 in 2020 and was able to overcome it, but died from complications of a bedsore on 17 August 2020.

References

External links
 
 
 

1919 births
2020 deaths
Athletes (track and field) at the 1948 Summer Olympics
European Athletics Championships medalists
Medalists at the 1948 Summer Olympics
Olympic athletes of Sweden
Olympic bronze medalists for Sweden
Olympic bronze medalists in athletics (track and field)
People from Bollnäs Municipality
Swedish Army officers
Swedish centenarians
Swedish male sprinters
Men centenarians
Deaths from ulcers
Sportspeople from Gävleborg County